South Somerset District Council in Somerset, England is elected every four years. Since 2019 the council is divided into 34 wards electing 60 councillors.

Political control
Since the first election to the council in 1973 political control of the council has been held by the following parties:

Leadership
The leaders of the council since 2006 have been:

Council elections
1973 Yeovil District Council election
1976 Yeovil District Council election (New ward boundaries)
1979 Yeovil District Council election
1983 Yeovil District Council election
1987 South Somerset District Council election
1991 South Somerset District Council election (New ward boundaries & district boundary changes also took place)
1995 South Somerset District Council election
1999 South Somerset District Council election (New ward boundaries)
2003 South Somerset District Council election
2007 South Somerset District Council election
2011 South Somerset District Council election
2015 South Somerset District Council election
2019 South Somerset District Council election (New ward boundaries)

District result maps

By-election results

1995-1999

1999-2003

2003-2007

2007-2011

References

By-election results

External links
South Somerset District Council

 
Council elections in Somerset
South Somerset
South Somerset